Mosalsk is a town and the administrative center of Mosalsky District in Kaluga Oblast, Russia, located  west of Kaluga, the administrative center of the oblast. Population:

History

First attested in 1231 as Masalsk, it became the center of one of the Upper Oka Principalities in the 14th century. After Ivan III annexed the principality to the Grand Duchy of Moscow in 1493, local princes emigrated either to the Grand Duchy of Lithuania (where they became known as Princes Massalski) or to Moscow (where they were known as Princes Koltsov-Mosalsky). Mosalsk was granted town status within Kaluga Governorate in 1776.

Administrative and municipal status
Within the framework of administrative divisions, Mosalsk serves as the administrative center of Mosalsky District, to which it is directly subordinated. As a municipal division, the town of Mosalsk is incorporated within Mosalsky Municipal District as Mosalsk Urban Settlement.

Architecture
The town's main landmark is St. Nicholas Cathedral (1818).

Notable people
The town was the birthplace of Professor Alexander Ivanovich Chuprov.

References

Notes

Sources

External links
Mojgorod.ru. Entry on Mosalsk 
Pictures of St. Nicholas Cathedral in Mosalsk

Cities and towns in Kaluga Oblast
Mosalsky Uyezd